Faristenia circulicaudata is a moth in the family Gelechiidae. It is found in China (Shaanxi).

References

Faristenia
Moths described in 1998